The Lecho Formation is a geological formation in the Salta Basin of the provinces Jujuy and Salta of northwestern Argentina.  Its strata date back to the Early Maastrichtian, and is a unit of the Salta Group. The fine-grained bioturbated sandstones of the formation were deposited in a fluvial to lacustrine coastal plain environment.

Dinosaur remains are among the fossils that have been recovered from the formation.

According to Frankfurt and Chiappe (1999), the Lecho Formation is composed of reddish sandstones. The Lecho is part of the Upper/Late Cretaceous Balbuena Subgroup (Salta Group), which is a near-border stratigraphic unit of the Andean sedimentary basin. Fossils from this formation include the titanosaur Saltasaurus along with a variety of avian and non-avian theropods.

Fossil content

See also 
 List of dinosaur-bearing rock formations
 Marília Formation

References

Bibliography 
 
 
  
 

 
Geologic formations of Argentina
Cretaceous Argentina
Sandstone formations
Fluvial deposits
Lacustrine deposits
Cretaceous paleontological sites of South America
Paleontology in Argentina